Jeongseon station is a railway station on the Jeongseon Line in Jeongseon, Gangwon, South Korea.

External links
Cyber station information from Korail 

Railway stations in Gangwon Province, South Korea
Jeongseon County
Railway stations opened in 1967